Aghel Kamar (also romanized as Āghel Kamar and Āghol Kamar) is a village in Karizan Rural District, Nasrabad District, Torbat-e Jam County, Razavi Khorasan Province, Iran. At the 2006 census, its population was 155, in 39 families.

See also 

 List of cities, towns and villages in Razavi Khorasan Province

References 

Populated places in Torbat-e Jam County